Bradley-Latimer Summer House is a historic home located at Wrightsville Beach, New Hanover County, North Carolina. It was built about 1855, and is a picturesque, two-story, three bays wide by two bays deep, hipped-roof dwelling.  It features a broad, one-story veranda encompassing the entire structure.

It was listed on the National Register of Historic Places in 1987.

References

Houses on the National Register of Historic Places in North Carolina
Houses completed in 1855
Houses in New Hanover County, North Carolina
National Register of Historic Places in New Hanover County, North Carolina